Shamim or Shameem (Bengali: শামীম, Urdu: شمیم) is a Hindic name that may refer to
Given name
Shamim Aftab, Pakistani politician
Shamim Ahamed Roni, Bangladeshi film director and screenwriter
Shamim Ahmad, Indian politician 
Shamim Ahmed (born 1942), Pakistani politician
Shamim Ahmed Khan (1938–2012), Indian sitarist and composer
Shameem Akhtar, Bangladeshi film director and screenwriter
Shamim Akhtar (born  1927), Pakistani politician 
Shamim Alam Khan (born 1937), Pakistani general
Shamim Ara (1938–2016), Pakistani film actress, film director and film producer
Shamim Ara Nipa, Bangladeshi dancer and choreographer
Shamim Ara Panhwar, Pakistani politician
Shamim Azad (born 1952), Bangladeshi-born British poet, storyteller and writer
Shamim Bano (1914–1984), Indian and Pakistani film actress 
Shamim Chowdhury, English television and print journalist
Shameem Dev Azad, Indian singer
Shamim Farooqui (1943–2014), Indian Urdu poet
Shamim Haider Patwary (born 1981), Bangladeshi politician
Shamim Haider Tirmazi, Pakistani scholar
Shamim Hanfi (born 1938), Urdu critic and dramatist
Shamim Hashimi (born 1947), Urdu and Persian poet
Shamim Hashmi (1940–2006), Indian politician
Shamim Hilaly (born 1947), Pakistani actress
Shamim Hossain (born 2000), Bangladeshi cricketer
Shamim Jairajpuri (born 1942), Indian zoologist
Shamim Jawad, Afghan children worker
Shamim Kabir (1944–2019), Bangladeshi cricketer
Shamim Kaisar Lincoln, Bangladesh politician
Shamim Karhani (1913–1975), Urdu-language poet
Shamim M. Momin, American art director
Shamim Mumtaz, Pakistani politician
Shamim Osman (born 1961), Bangladesh politician 
Shamim Sarif (born 1969), British novelist and filmmaker
Shaikh Shamim Ahmed (1938–2019), Indian politician and social worker
Shamim Sikder (born 1953), Bangladeshi sculptor

Surname
Aftab Iqbal Shamim (born 1936), Urdu-language poet
Alhaj Shamim Uddin (born 1931), Pakistani politician
Anwar Shamim (1931–2013), Pakistani Air Chief Marshal 
AKM Enamul Haque Shamim (born 1965), Bangladesh politician
AKM Shamim Chowdhury, Bangladeshi journalist
Arshad Shamim, Singaporean professional footballer
Bridget Shamim Bangi (born 1993), Ugandan badminton player
Halitha Shameem, Indian film director, screenwriter and editor
Khalid Shameem Wynne (1953–2017), Pakistani general
Nazhat Shameem, Fijian judge
Rameen Shamim (born 1996), Pakistani cricketer
S. A. Shamim, Indian politician 
Sardar Muhammad Shamim Khan (born 1958), Pakistani jurist
Shaista Shameem, Fijian lawyer
Zahidunnabi Dewan Shamim (born 1968), Bangladeshi physician, biomedical researcher, politician and social worker